HMS Burslem was a Hunt-class minesweeper of the Royal Navy from World War I. She was originally to be named Blakeney, but this was changed to avoid any conflict between the vessel name and the coastal location of the same name in Norfolk, instead the ship was named after Burslem, a town in Staffordshire.

References
 

 

Hunt-class minesweepers (1916)
Royal Navy ship names
1918 ships